The Maghreb Virtual Science Library (MVSL) (la Bibliothèque numérique des sciences du Maghreb  المكتبة العلمية الافتراضية المغاربية )  provided full-text access to thousands of science and engineering journals and databases to researchers in the Maghreb via digital library portals. It was a project funded by the U.S. Department of State Bureau of Oceans & International Environmental and Scientific Affairs, and is implemented by CRDF Global along with IMIST (Institut Marocain de l'Information Scientifique et Technique), LibHub, Research4Life, and JSTOR.

The Maghreb Virtual Science Library program is an initiative of CRDF Global that supports scientific capacity, technology innovation, and regional and international scientific cooperation through the development of an innovative research platform that provides access to comprehensive collections of research information. By providing effective and accessible tools for researchers in the  Maghreb to find and download articles from international journals where new discoveries and innovations are published, as well as making research from the region available  through a global, open-access delivery model,  the program supports the increased engagement of researchers from the Maghreb region in international scientific discourse.

About
The Maghreb Virtual Science Library (MVSL) Program provides full-text access to thousands of science and engineering journals and databases to researchers in the Maghreb, improves the international dissemination of research from the region, and supports new online tools for discovering and working with collaborators in the Maghreb. The most visible parts of the MVSL Program are the MVSL [maghrebvsl.org website] and the national portals where each country’s full text journal articles can be comprehensively searched and accessed. Behind the scenes, the MVSL program includes consultations and workshops involving all of the implementing partners to assure that the users are supported to get the most from the system and to assure that the web-based systems are operating smoothly.

Mission and Objectives
The MVSL project aims to establish a sustainable resource for international collaboration and knowledge access and dissemination for the academic community in the Maghreb through cutting-edge access to technologies and expert support for users, administrators, and decision makers.

Access
In partnership with the responsible organizations in each country, CRDF Global aims to transform scholarly communication across the region.

The MVSL Program leverages cutting edge technologies to provide an efficient and intuitive research platform through which scientists are able to search a single, up-to-date database of all of the resources available to them, encouraging exploration and scientific discovery.

The program also seeks to enhance the range of resources available through country portals by forging partnerships with international programs and providing negotiation support to regional partners to secure sustainable access to licensed scientific resources.

Dissemination
The MVSL Program aims to promote the global dissemination of scientific output from the region by providing support and offering technologies to ensure that dissertations, nationally published journals, reports, and monographs can be found and read by colleagues across the globe.

Through the adoption of open-access protocols, the MVSL Program aims to expand the global visibility and impact of new knowledge originating from the Maghreb.

Collaboration
The MVSL Program will combine tools for access and dissemination with tools for colleague discovery and collaboration across institutions and national borders. If the researcher permits it, the MVSL site will suggest potential new collaborators based on research interests and search requests.

The MVSL Program will support new and existing collaborations through a web-based toolset that is integrated into each MVSL country site.

Countries
Although the MVSL Program is initially working with Morocco, Algeria, and Tunisia, the Program will expand to include Mauritania, and, as circumstances and funding permit, Libya.
Algeria
Morocco
Tunisia
Mauritania
Mauritanian researchers established a Center for Research in Renewable Energy at the University of Nouakchott and received an international award for malaria research. Science and engineering students in Mauritania account for more than 1/3 of university degree program enrollments.
Libya
In Libya, scientists have transformed the research base to focus on addressing national and regional challenges in areas such water resources, renewable energy, and medicine

Open Access
The MVSL Open portal is a free gateway for everyone in the Maghreb to access to a wide range of research publications and databases usually available only within universities. The topics covered range from law, history, and music to business planning, finance, patent searching, and the latest scientific discoveries. MVSL Open uses leading-edge searching and indexing software to provide easy access to the full text of current research from all over the world.

There is no cost to use the MVSL Open site, and there are no membership or affiliation restrictions

External links 
 Maghreb Virtual Science Library
 Algeria Portal
 Morocco Portal
 Tunisia Portal
 Open Access Portal

Digital libraries